Captains and the Kings is an eight-part television miniseries broadcast on NBC in 1976 as part of its Best Sellers anthology series. It is an adaptation of the 1972 novel Captains and the Kings by Taylor Caldwell. Like the novel, the miniseries is about an Irish American family, headed by ambitious Irish immigrant Joseph Armagh (played by Richard Jordan), which accumulates economic and political power during the 19th and early 20th centuries.

Cast

Main

 Richard Jordan as Joseph Armagh
 Harvey Jason as Harry Zieff
 Patty Duke as Bernadette Hennessey Armagh
 Blair Brown as Elizabeth Healey Hennessey
 Robert Vaughn as Charles Desmond
 Perry King as Rory Armagh
 Katherine Crawford as Mary Armagh
 Jane Seymour as Marjorie Chisholm
 Bernard Behren as Gentleman
 Cynthia Sikes as Claudia
 Charles Durning as Ed Healey
 David Huffman as Sean Armagh
 Terry Kiser as Courtney Wickersham
 Vic Morrow as Tom Hennessey
 Barbara Parkins as Martinique
 Joanna Pettet as Katherine Hennessey
 Doug Heyes Jr. as Kevin Armagh
 Jenny Sullivan as Honora Houlihan
 Beverly D'Angelo as Miss Emmy

Supporting

 Peter Donat as Clair Montrose
 Henry Fonda as Sen. Enfield Bassett
 John Houseman as Judge Newell Chisholm
 Celeste Holm as Sister Angela
 Joe Kapp as Strickland
 Ann Dusenberry as Anne-Marie
 Rod Haase as Mace
 Charles H. Gray as Captain Calvin
 Charles O. Lynch as Hotel Clerk
 Roberta Storm as Mrs. Calvin
 Ray Bolger as R.J. Squibbs
 Sian Barbara Allen as Cara Leslie
 Neville Brand as O'Herlihy
 John Carradine as Father Hale
 Lee de Broux as Teddy Roosevelt
 Robert Donner as Wounded Texan
 George Gaynes as Orestes Bradley
 Stefan Gierasch as Gannon
 Alan Hewitt as Gov. Hackett
 Cliff De Young as Brian Armagh
 Burl Ives as Old Syrup
 Clifton James as Gov. Skerritt
 Roger Robinson as Cpl. Lincoln Douglas
 Pernell Roberts as Braithwaite
 Ken Swofford as Capt. Muldoon
 Terence Locke as Faylen
 William Prince as Jay Regan
 Ford Rainey as Abraham Lincoln
 Richard Herd as Talmadge
 Walter O. Miles as Doctor
 Mills Watson as Preston
 John Herbsleb as Young Courtney
 Macon McCalman as Dolan
 James O'Connell as Orren Teale
 Ann Sothern as Mrs. Finch
 Patrick Labyorteaux as Young Rory
 Leslie Simms as Mrs. Teale
 Johnny Doran as Young Joseph
 Harvey Gold as Miles Lawrence
 Sally Kirkland as Aggie
 George Skaff as Prosecutor
 Philip Bourneuf as Father Scanlon
 Edward Edwards as 1st Soccer Player
 John Dennis Johnston as Medical Orderly
 Ronald Long as Hotel Clerk
 Connie Kreski as Pearl Gray
 Kermit Murdock as James Spaulding
 Eldon Quick as Albert
 Randy Shields as 2nd Soccer Player
 William Bryant as Skeeter
 William D. Gordon as Doctor Gill
 Sandy Ward as Louie
 Vincent Milana as 1st Striker
 Norman Stuart as Swiss Gentleman
 Ned Wilson as Van Cleve
 Stephen Coit as President William McKinley
 John de Lancie as Timothy Armagh
 Sterling Swanson as Spokesman
 Ted Gehring as Heckler
 Patrick Whyte as English Gentleman
 Todd Martin as Bensinger
 Ben Wright as German Gentleman
 Albert Carrier as French Gentleman
 Byron Webster as William Jennings Bryan
 Grant Owens as Captain O'Neill
 Elizabeth Cheshire as Young Bernadette

Awards
Both Patty Duke and Jane Seymour were nominated for the Emmy Award for Outstanding Lead Actress in a Limited Series for their performances; Duke won the award. Jordan won a Golden Globe Award and an Emmy nomination for his performance. Durning was nominated for both an Emmy and a Golden Globe. Beverly D'Angelo made her debut. Cinematographer Ric Waite won his only Emmy Award for his work on the miniseries.

References

External links

1970s American television miniseries
Television series by Universal Television
Cultural depictions of Abraham Lincoln
Cultural depictions of William McKinley
Cultural depictions of Theodore Roosevelt